Fabio Norberto Marozzi (born 26 June 1967) is an Argentinian retired footballer of Italian descent who played primarily as forward.

Club career
Born in Buenos Aires, Marozzi began his career at Club Almirante Brown. In 1988 he had a short spell with Peruvian top-flight club Alianza Atlético. In 1989–90 season he competed in Argentine Primera División playing for Instituto de Cordoba. In 1990 he played for Villa Dálmine (Primera B Nacional). In the summer of 1990 he joined Polish I liga site Śląsk Wrocław., becoming first foreign player in club's history. He made his league debut in 2–1 win against Zagłębie Sosnowiec on 20 October 1990, scoring a goal. Representing the club for 1,5 years Marozzi made 14 league appearances and scored 2 goals. After leaving Śląsk he withdrew from professional football.

Notes

References

External links
 
 
 Fabio Marozzi at INFOFUTBOL 

Living people
1967 births
Argentine footballers
Association football forwards
Argentine expatriate footballers
Argentine people of Italian descent
Alianza Atlético footballers
Club Almirante Brown footballers
Instituto footballers
Śląsk Wrocław players
Villa Dálmine footballers
Ekstraklasa players
Argentine Primera División players
Primera Nacional players
Expatriate footballers in Poland
Argentine expatriate sportspeople in Poland
Footballers from Buenos Aires